Lake Ida is a small natural freshwater lake on the north side of Frostproof, Florida. This lake has no park areas or public swimming beaches. The north side is bordered by Lake Ida Road. The northern two-thirds of the lake is surrounded by citrus groves.

References

Lakes of Polk County, Florida